The Australian Schoolboys refer to junior teams that represent Australia in various sports.  The name is mainly used in rugby league, rugby union and baseball. Other popular team sports in Australia such as cricket, basketball, association football (soccer) and Australian rules football generally use age related team names, such as Under 18s, rather than the schoolboys title.

Baseball
Australian Schoolboys national baseball team
Rugby league
Australia national schoolboy rugby league team
Rugby union
Australia national schoolboy rugby union team

See also

References

High school sports in Australia
Youth sport in Australia
National youth sports teams of Australia